Rikiya (written: 力也 or 力哉) is a masculine Japanese given name. Notable people with the name include:

, Japanese jazz drummer
, Japanese footballer
, Japanese actor and voice actor
, Japanese footballer
, Japanese actor
, Japanese actor and singer

Japanese masculine given names